Łopiennik Górny  is a village in Krasnystaw County, Lublin Voivodeship, in eastern Poland. It is the seat of the gmina (administrative district) called Gmina Łopiennik Górny.

The village has a population of 563.

References

Villages in Krasnystaw County
Lublin Governorate